Guri (lit. Nine Villages Town(Town of Nine Villages) is a city in Gyeonggi Province, South Korea. It is located immediately to the east of Seoul, in the heart of the Capital Metropolitan Area.

The Royal Tombs of the Joseon Dynasty are located in the city. The hill of Achasan is also located here, site of the Baekje-era Achasanseong and numerous hiking trails. It also has pleasant walking paths along Wang-suk-cheon, a small creek separating Guri from Namyangju. The traditional town market in Doldari (Guri's downtown around what used to be a "stone bridge") provides a cheap alternative to department stores.

Guri first became a separate city in 1986.  Previously, it had been considered part of Yangju from antiquity until 1980, and part of Namyangju from 1980 to 1986. The name "Guri" was first used in 1914, at which time it was a myeon in Yangju. Guri is connected to Seoul via two rail lines (Gyeongui–Jungang Line via Guri station, Gyeongchun Line via Galmae station), as well as numerous city transit and intercity buses. In 2014, the extension of Seoul Subway Line 8 began which will connect Guri to the Seoul Metro in October 2023.

Location 
It lies east-northern area of Gyeonggi province. The mountain of Achasan is to the west and the city of Namyangju to east.

In fact, Guri used to be bigger but some of the townships were incorporated into Seoul and other cities surrounding Guri.

Topography 
The Gwangju mountains are around the north-western area of Guri City. They are usually higher than 1000 meters, but to the exact west, there are lower hills.

Wamgsil Stream and the Han River flow into city and it has about seventeen tributaries.

Climate 
Guri has a humid continental climate (Köppen: Dwa), but can be considered a borderline humid subtropical climate (Köppen: Cwa) using the  isotherm.

Notable people from Guri 
BoA - singer, songwriter, dancer, record producer and actress, she is known as the "Queen of K-pop."
 Xiumin – singer, rapper, dancer, model, actor, MC and member of (EXO, EXO-M and EXO-CBX)
 Jang Dongwoo – singer, rapper, dancer, model, songwriter, producer, actor and MC (Infinite and Infinite H)
 Gong Myung – actor and singer (5urprise)
 Choi Yoo-jung – singer, rapper, dancer, songwriter and actress (Weki Meki)
 Jihyo – singer, dancer and MC (Twice)
 Doyoung - singer, dancer and MC (NCT, NCT U and NCT 127)

Sister cities 
  Calamba, Laguna, Philippines
  Carrollton, Texas, United States

See also
 List of cities in South Korea
 Geography of South Korea

References

Notes

External links

 City government website 
 City Council website 

 
Cities in Gyeonggi Province